Kelly Mitchell, Queen of the Gypsy Nation (c. 1868 – 1915) was an American woman who was celebrated as a leader of the Romani people in the US state of Mississippi. Her grave continues to be visited by thousands of people each year, and is one of the most important landmarks in Meridian.

Biography
Kelly Mitchell was born around 1868. She is said to be the descendant of a group of Romani people who, expelled from Europe, had migrated to South America and from there made their way into the United States. A document found in the Lauderdale County Department of Archives and History says she was born in Brazil, and that her mother was a native Brazilian who married into a Romani family. Kelly then left for America and married Emil Mitchell, who in 1909 became King of the Gypsies after the death of his father.

She died in labor, during the birth of her 14th or 15th child, in Coatopa, Alabama, but was buried in Meridian. Her body was kept on ice for about six weeks, to allow for the news to be disseminated to various groups of Romani in the Southeast and give them time to come to Meridian. A service was held in St. Paul's Episcopal Church; 20,000 people attended her funeral. She is buried with her husband, Emil, and the cemetery became the final resting place for many other Roma, including her successor, Flora.

Legacy
Tens of thousands of people visit her grave each year. Various myths have been spread about her and her grave--that the coffin was made out of gold, that a huge sum of money would have been buried with her, and multiple attempts have been made to rob her grave. 

Roma people were often stereotyped as fortunetellers, and some of Mitchell's relatives who live in Meridian practice the profession, though it was illegal to do so within Meridian city limits until 2011.

References

1915 deaths
American Romani people
People from Meridian, Mississippi